This is a list of vampire films.

Dracula films

Carmilla films

Elizabeth Bathory films

Other vampire films

See also 
Vampire films
List of vampire television series
Vampire literature
List of fictional vampires
Bloodsucking Cinema, a documentary film about vampire films

Notes

External links
 Lists of the best vampire films:
 25 Best Reviewed Vampire Movies at Rotten Tomatoes
 The Best and Worst Vampire Movies at Cinematical blog
 Top 10 Vampire Films (excluding films with Dracula) at About.com
 Top Vampire Films from Cult TV
 Top 70 vampire films top 70 list of vampire films of all time
 Taliesin's Top 100 the top 100 on the Taliesin Meets the Vampires blog
 Vampyrus
 Horror Music

Vampire